Clane GAA is a Gaelic Athletic Association (GAA) club in Clane, County Kildare, Ireland, winner of 17 Kildare county senior football championships, 16 county senior hurling championships and Kildare club of the year in 1975. Clane players are credited with bringing the handpass into Gaelic football. Richard Cribben was regarded as one of the best players in the game in the 1890s and played on the international team that played England at Stamford Bridge in 1896. Pa Connolly (a Cuchulainn All-Star award winner in 1963) and Tommy Carew featured on the Kildare football team of the millennium. Martin Lynch was an All Stars Award winner in 1991.

History
Clane town sports pre-date the GAA, those of 12 June 1884 on a field opposite the Dispensary House being reported as "ayquel to Punchestown" by the Leinster Leader. Dr O’Connor, organizer of the 1885 sports became first chairman of Kildare county board. A Leinster Leader report in April 1887 claims Clane had ‘the honour of being the first club to be established in County Kildare.’ Clane were first Kildare football champions, a Clongowes Teacher member of the team Professor Crowley was later accredited with having invented the handpass. RIC records from 1890 show that Clane William O'Briens had 50 members with officers listed as CJ O'Connor (who was also first chairman of Kildare county board) John Geoghegan, Maurice Sammon and James Archer. A set of white jerseys from a house rugby team at Clongowes, used by the club after 1901, were used for the 1903 All Ireland final leading to the tradition of Kildare wearing all white as their county colours: the Lily Whites.

Gaelic Football
The Clane-Roseberry duopoly between 1901 and 1910 was responsible for raising standards in Kildare. Eight Clane players Larry ‘Hussey’ Cribbin, Bill Merriman, Ned Kennedy, Joe Rafferty, Jim Wright, Bill Bracken, William ‘Steel’ Losty and Johnny Dunne participated to Kildare’s cathartic twice-replayed home final appearance against Kerry in 1903 and first All Ireland success in 1905. By the time the club was seriously affected by the Irish Civil War, it had won eight county titles. Pa Connolly spearheaded the revival of the 1960s which resulted in three more titles, including the dramatic comeback of 1967 which turned a four-point deficit into a six-point win in the final ten minutes. Martin Lynch was the star of the 1990s when Clane won four more titles in a six-year period. After Clane won the 1997 county championship with nine Kildare players in the line-up they went to the Leinster Senior Club Football Championship final, eventually losing to Erins Isle, and provided six players for the Kildare team that reached the 1998 All-Ireland Senior Football Championship final.

Hurling
The decision of Dick Brien to bring a set of hurleys to Clane and the appointment of Wexfordman, John P Lacey, as secretary of the Clane club in 1903 established hurling in the club. Clane went on to win 16 titles before 1922, including a famous comeback against Landenstown from seven points down in 1920. A split in 1922, probably related to the civil war, led to the establishment of Mainham hurling club. In their glory period Clane had lost just two finals, to Maynooth on objection in 1913 and to Celbridge when some of their players were missing in 1921. They returned to senior ranks in the 1990s. David Harney was Kildare club hurler of the year in 2004.
League Champs 2009.
Clane Minor hurling team won the Minor B league on 4 May 2012 defeating Eire Og Choirracoill on a score of 2-15 to 2-05.
Clane won the Kildare Junior Hurling Championship in 2013 beating Naas in the final.

Camogie
The club was founded in 1931 when Bridie Ennis was listed as ‘one of the best players in the county.’ Clane won the county championship in 1939 shortly before the club lapsed and the best players joined Sallins. A team trained by Wexford man Ned Coughlan won the 1953 league and championship, the 1962 senior league, but the club lapsed again 1966-1976. Clane revived in 1976 and won league and championship in 1977 wearing the green gym-slips of the local Scoil Mhuire. They won junior league and championship in 1980 but lapsed in 1983 when the best players joined Prosperous. Geraldine Dwyer and Marianne Johnson were selected on the Kildare camogie team of the century. Clane hosted the final of the 1993 Gael Linn Cup inter-provincial series.
Clane camogie won the Kildare Intermediate final on Sunday 30 September defeating Leixlip on a scoreline of 2-06 to 1-05.
Clane were captained by Sabine Kennedy and managed by 'The Special One' from Cork, Bernard Crowley with the assistance of John Cribbin and Tony O' Grady.
Clane retained the Intermediate Championship in 2013 with a hard fought victory over Leixlip on a scoreline of 4-11 to 3-09. Clane were captained by the veteran Karen O'Reilly with Ciara Herbert as vice captain. Manager this year was Louise Conlon ably assisted by Ciara Smullen and Tony O' Grady. In 2016, the minor camogie team won the Division 1 Minor Cup final with a score of 1-7 to 0-6 against Naas.

Honours
 Leinster Senior Club Football Championship Finalists 1997
 Kildare Senior Football Championship: (17) 1888, 1892, 1895, 1897, 1901, 1902, 1903, 1916, 1963, 1967, 1975, 1980, 1984, 1991, 1992, 1995, 1997
 Kildare Under-21 'A' Football Championship: (1) 2018
Kildare Minor A Football Championship(1) 2017
 Kildare Under-21 'A' Football Shield (1) 2013
 Kildare Intermediate Football Championship: (2) 1940, 1949
 Kildare Junior Football Championship: (1) 1929
 Kildare Junior B Football Championship: (1) 1977
 Kildare Minor A Football League Winners (2) 2015, 2017
 Kildare Senior Hurling Championship: (16) 1903, 1904, 1905, 1906, 1907, 1908, 1909, 1910, 1911, 1914, 1915, 1916, 1917, 1918, 1919, 1922
 Kildare Senior Hurling League Winners (1) 2009
 Kildare Junior Hurling League Winners (1) 2008
 Kildare Junior Hurling Championship: (4) 1915, 1945, 1994, 2013
Kildare Under-21 'B' Hurling Championship: (2) 2018, 2019
 Kildare Senior Camogie Championship: (1) 1953
 Kildare Intermediate Camogie Championship (3) 2008, 2012, 2013
 Kildare Junior Camogie Championship (2) 1977, 1980
 Kildare Senior Camogie League: (2) 1953, 1962
 Kildare Junior Camogie league: (2) 1976, 1980
 Kildare Minor Camogie Division 1 Winners 2016
Kildare Junior C Ladies Football Championship: (1) 2008
Leinster Junior A Ladies Football Championship Finalists: 2014

Bibliography
 Clane GAA A Century - A History Of The Club And The People (Clane GAA Club) 1985, 528pp.
 Kildare GAA: A Centenary History, by Eoghan Corry, CLG Chill Dara, 1984,  hb  pb
 Kildare GAA yearbook, 1972, 1974, 1978, 1979, 1980 and 2000- in sequence especially the Millennium yearbook of 2000
 Soaring Sliothars: Centenary of Kildare Camogie 1904-2004 by Joan O'Flynn Kildare County Camogie Board.

External links

Kildare GAA site
Kildare Hurling site
Kildare GAA club sites
Kildare on Hoganstand.com

Gaelic games clubs in County Kildare
Hurling clubs in County Kildare
Gaelic football clubs in County Kildare
Clane